Natalo A. Russo (born July 31, 1970) is an American fantasy fiction author.  He is best known for his series The Mukhtaar Chronicles.

Russo also authors an award-winning blog for fellow writers, entitled A Writer's Journey, in which he documents his experiences as an independent writer and offers writing tips. Russo maintains an active presence on various social media outlets, including Facebook, Twitter, Pinterest, and LinkedIn.

Biography

According to his personal bio, he has held many jobs over the years before becoming an author, including pizza maker, radio DJ, Catholic seminarian, police officer, and software engineer, his current profession. He also holds a degree in Philosophy and a black belt in Tang Soo Do.

Influences

Russo has stated on a number of occasions that his primary writing influence is Raymond E. Feist, author of the Riftwar Saga. Since the mid-1990s, Russo has maintained an online relationship with Feist.

He also credits fellow author and editor Joan Reginaldo, and James Scott Bell, for improving his craft as a writer.

Bibliography

Necromancer Awakening, the first book of The Mukhtaar Chronicles, was published on April 9, 2014.  On August 8, 2014, he released a follow-up prequel to Necromancer Awakening entitled The Road to Dar Rodon.  A direct sequel to Necromancer Awakening, entitled Necromancer Falling, was published on May 29, 2016, in Kindle format.

Novels

The Mukhtaar Chronicles

Novelettes

Tales of the Mukhtaar Lords

References

External links
 "Book Review: Necromancer Awakening by Nat Russo"
 "Nat Russo – WIP interview"
 "Interview with Author Nat Russo"

1970 births
21st-century American male writers
21st-century American novelists
American bloggers
American fantasy writers
American male bloggers
American male novelists
American software engineers
Engineers from New York City
Living people
Novelists from Arizona
Novelists from New York (state)
Novelists from Texas
People from Prescott, Arizona
Writers from Austin, Texas
Writers from Queens, New York